is a town located in Nagano Prefecture, Japan. , the town had an estimated population of 9,446 in 3599 households, and a population density of 110 persons per km2.

Geography
Iijima is located in-between the Kiso Mountains and Mount Senjō of the Akaishi Mountains of south-central Nagano Prefecture. The Chikuma River flows through the town.

Surrounding municipalities
Nagano Prefecture
 Komagane
 Iida
 Nakagawa
 Matsukawa
 Ōkuwa

Climate
The town has a climate characterized by hot and humid summers, and cold winters (Köppen climate classification Cfa).

Economy
The local economy is agricultural, dominated by rice and horticulture.

History
The area of present-day Iijima was part of ancient Shinano Province, and developed as a post station in the Sanshū Kaidō highway linking inland regions of Shinano with the Pacific Ocean. The area was tenryō territory controlled directly by the Tokugawa shogunate until the Meiji restoration. The modern village of Iijima established on April 1, 1889, by the establishment of the municipalities system and was elevated to town status on January 1, 1954. The town annexed the neighboring village of Nakakubō on September 30, 1956.

Demographics
Per Japanese census data, the population of Iijima has remained relatively steady from 1960 until 2000 but has decreased slightly in recent years.

Education
Iijima has two public elementary schools and one public middle school operated by the town government. The town does not have a high school.

Transportation

Railway
 Central Japan Railway Company - Iida Line
 -  -  -  -

Highway
  Chūō Expressway

International relations 
 - Ferraz de Vasconcelos, city in province of São Paulo, Brazil. Since May 1975.

Local attractions
Iijima jin'ya

References

External links 

Official Website 

 
Towns in Nagano Prefecture